Tanbalan (also Romanized as Tanbalān) is a village in Zarabad-e Gharbi Rural District, Zarabad District, Konarak County, Sistan and Baluchestan Province, Iran. At the 2006 census, its population was 455, in 119 families.

References 

Populated places in Konarak County